Sister (シスター) is the fifteenth single by the Japanese Pop-rock band Porno Graffitti. It was released on September 8, 2004. 

Now his after Tama withdrawal is the first single of the nascent Porno Graffitti became two systems. In addition major debut fifth anniversary 15 of his single and 20's last work for the two members became the various milestone overlap work for Porno Graffitti.

Co-written by two of Akihito and Haruichi the two works of "Human Being" and "Tenki Shokunin" of the coupling is the first time.

Track listing

References

2004 singles
Porno Graffitti songs
2004 songs
SME Records singles